Michel Aluzio da Cruz Alves, better known as Michel Alves (Pelotas, 25 April 1981) is a Brazilian football player acting as goalkeeper. He plays for Botafogo da Paraíba

Career
He started in the youth of Brazil Pelotas, was also active in Vila Nova-GO before moving to the Youth. When he reached the youth took a year without playing in the reserve at least one game. But the reward came in 2007 when, despite the club being relegated in the Brazilian Championship, he was one of the goalkeepers melhors championship, arousing interest in several clubs. But with a huge account with the club and the fans, he chose to stay at the club saw.

In late 2008, the youth decided not to renew his contract in a process of cutting spending. Eventually moved to the International, where he became immediate booking of Lauro. Holder was in important matches such as the Copa Suruga Bank 2009.

In 2010, he left Inter and moved to Ceará Sporting Club.

Career statistics

Honours
 Vila Nova
 Campeonato Goiano: 2005

 Internacional
 Campeonato Gaúcho: 2009
 Suruga Bank Championship: 2009

 Botafogo da Paraíba
 Campeonato Paraibano: 2017

Contract
 Ceará.

References

External links
zerozerofootball.com

1981 births
Brazilian footballers
Living people
Campeonato Brasileiro Série A players
Campeonato Brasileiro Série B players
Campeonato Brasileiro Série C players
Grêmio Esportivo Brasil players
Vila Nova Futebol Clube players
Esporte Clube Juventude players
Sport Club Internacional players
Ceará Sporting Club players
Criciúma Esporte Clube players
CR Vasco da Gama players
Botafogo Futebol Clube (PB) players
Association football goalkeepers